Sierra de las Ánimas is a hill range which starts in Lavalleja Department of Uruguay and extends south into Maldonado Department.

Features

Here in Maldonado Department it includes one of the highest peaks of Uruguay, the top of Cerro de las Ánimas , near the towns Gregorio Aznárez and Las Flores. 

It is the only elevated landform of volcanic origin in Uruguay.

Related landform

It is a branch of the Cuchilla Grande which extends north - northeast through Treinta y Tres Department into Cerro Largo Department, and which includes secondary ranges.

See also

 Geography of Uruguay

Hills of Uruguay
Landforms of Lavalleja Department
Landforms of Maldonado Department